

Season

Série A

Palmeiras started well the campaign in the Série A, and led the tournament for 19 rounds, unfortunately the team failed to keep the good results and after a 3–1 away win against Santos, only winning 9 points in 11 matches.

Palmeiras ended in 5th place, it was a disappointing result for a team that played well during almost the entire season and wanted to win the first brazilian title since 1994.

The Palmeiras player with most goals was Obina with 12 goals in 27 league matches, that signed a 1-year loan deal from Flamengo and left the squad before the end of the season after a fight with teammate Maurício during a 0–2 away loss to Grêmio.

Vágner Love returned to the team in August, after an agreement with CSKA Moscow, and scored 5 goals in 12 matches but he didn't have a good return to the team. Attacking midfielder Diego Souza won the award by Placar as the best player of the league, playing 34 matches and scoring 8 goals in the season, including a wonderful midfield goal against Atlético Mineiro. Cleiton Xavier, Pierre, Marcos and Pablo Armero also made great appearances in the league.

Manager Vanderlei Luxemburgo left the team on 25 June alongside young striker Keirrison, after a discussion with Palmeiras chairman Luiz Gonzaga de Mello Belluzzo. The Interim Manager Jorginho assumed the team for 1 month with great results and Muricy Ramalho took charge of the team until the end of the season.

Pld = Matches played; W = Matches won; D = Matches drawn; L = Matches lost; F = Goals for; A = Goals against; GD = Goal difference; Pts = Points

Libertadores Cup

First stage

Group stage

Knockout stage

2009
Brazilian football clubs 2009 season